Graeme Codrington is a South African author, researcher and strategy consultant, and director of strategic insights firm, Tomorrow Today.

Career 

Codrington has a degree in Commerce from the University of Witwatersrand, Honours in Theology and Youth Work from University of Zululand, followed by a Masters degree in Diaconology at the University of Pretoria, applying the work of Neil Howe and William Strauss's Strauss–Howe generational theory to South Africa and Africa. Codrington has completed a Doctorate of Business Administration at the unregistered Rushmore University.

Codrington has presented two TEDx talks, "The Third Wave of the Digital Age" at TEDx Square Mile in London in November 2012, and "The five key ingredients of a thriving remote team" at TEDx PretoriaStudio on 9 March 2021.

Publications 

Codrington has written several books and academic articles, including: 
 Coats, Keith and Graeme Codrington (2021 updated edition), Leading in a Changing World, TomorrowToday Global
 Bush, Nikki and Graeme Codrington (2019), Future-proof Your Child for the 2020s and Beyond, Penguin Random House South Africa
 Grant-Marshall, Sue and Graeme Codrington (2016 updated edition), Mind the Gap, Penguin Random House South Africa
 Bush, Nikki and Graeme Codrington (2012), Future-Proof Your Child: Parenting the Wired Generation, Penguin Random House South Africa
 Dawkins, Kerry and Graeme Codrington (2012), Navigating Your Career, Penguin Random House South Africa
 Fourie, Louis, Sue Grant-Marshall, and Graeme Codrington (2005, out of print), Mind Over Money, Penguin Random House

Controversy 
Codrington's Doctorate of Business Administration is from Rushmore University which is not an accredited college.

References 

1970 births
Living people
Futurologists
People from Johannesburg
South African business writers
South African consultants
University of South Africa alumni
University of the Witwatersrand alumni
University of Zululand alumni
Alumni of Parktown Boys' High School